Yvonne Twining Humber (1907–2004) was an American artist.
She was born in New York City and raised in Europe and New England where she received her first art instruction at South Egremont, MA.

Her work is included in the collections of the Seattle Art Museum, the National Gallery of Art, Washington, the Smithsonian American Art Museum and the RISD Museum

References

1907 births
2004 deaths
20th-century American women artists
Artists from New York City
21st-century American women